Goldenrod is a color that resembles the goldenrod plant.

A Crayola crayon with this name and color, although a lighter version, was created in 1958.


Goldenrod

Displayed at right is the web color goldenrod.

The color goldenrod is a representation of the color of some of the deeper gold colored goldenrod flowers.

The first known recorded use of goldenrod as a color name in English was in 1915.

Variations of goldenrod

Light goldenrod yellow

The web color light goldenrod yellow is displayed at right.

Pale goldenrod

The web color pale goldenrod is displayed at right.

Light goldenrod

The web color light goldenrod is displayed at right.

Dark goldenrod

The web color dark goldenrod is displayed at right.

Symbolism

 It is the color of paper that the Church of Scientology's Ethics Department prints its Suppressive Person Declares on, giving rise to the term "golden-rodding".
 Goldenrod is the name of a city in Pokémon Gold, Silver and Crystal, and their remakes Pokémon HeartGold and SoulSilver.
 The cartoon sitcom 'The Simpsons' referenced Goldenrod in the episode Pygmoelian. In the episode the show within a show 'It Never Ends' producers use Goldenrod coloured pages to signify certain storylines in their scripts.

See also

List of colors

References